William Bowie, B.S., C.E., M.A. (May 6, 1872 – August 28, 1940) was an American geodetic engineer.

Background and education
Bowie was born at Grassland, an historic estate near  Annapolis Junction, Anne Arundel County, Maryland, to Thomas John Bowie and Susanna Anderson. He was educated in public schools, at St. John's College in Annapolis, Maryland, Trinity College in Hartford, Connecticut (B.S. 1893; M.A. 1907; Sc.D. 1919), and Lehigh (C.E. 1895; Sc.D. 1922). He received honorary degrees (LL.D. 1936) from the University of Edinburgh, Scotland, at the meeting of the International Union of Geodesy and Geophysics (IUGG) of which he was president from 1933 to 1936, and from George Washington University (Sc.D. 1937).

Career
In 1895 Bowie entered the United States Coast and Geodetic Survey. During World War I he served in the United States Army Corps of Engineers as a major.

He represented the United States at various international geodetic conferences and congresses. His scientific researches had to do with the theory of isostasy and its applications to dynamic and structural geology. He retired from government service at the age of 64 in 1936.

Bowie's professional activity was directed toward three general objectives:
"Promotion of mapping of the United States and its territories and improvement of cartographic methods and technique.
Expansion of geodetic work and improvement of instruments and methods.
Promotion of interest and progress in geophysical sciences, through the media of national and international bodies."

He was elected in 1907 a Fellow of the American Association for the Advancement of Science, in 1925 a Fellow of the American Physical Society, and in 1927 a Member of the National Academy of Sciences.

He was the first President of the American Geophysical Union from 1920 to 1922 and served as president a second time from 1929 to 1932.

In 1932, Bowie received the Prix Charles Lagrange from the Académie royale des Sciences, des Lettres et des Beaux-Arts de Belgique.  He later received the Franklin Institute's Elliott Cresson Medal in 1937.

Personal
An Episcopalian, Bowie married Elizabeth Taylor Wattles of Alexandria, Virginia, on June 28, 1899. Together, they had two children, William (Jr.) and Clagett. William died after a three-week illness and lies buried in Arlington National Cemetery.

Legacy
Two undersea features, the Bowie Seamount and the Bowie Canyon, are named after William Bowie. The William Bowie Medal, the highest honor of the American Geophysical Union, is named in his honor. The U.S. Coast and Geodetic Survey coastal survey ship USC&GS Bowie (CSS 27), in commission from 1946 to 1967, was named for him.

See also 
List of geophysicists

References

Selected bibliography

External links
American Geophysical Union.org: Biography of William Bowie
William Bowie Obituary

American geodesists
1872 births
1940 deaths
B
Fellows of the American Association for the Advancement of Science
Fellows of the American Physical Society
Members of the United States National Academy of Sciences
United States Coast and Geodetic Survey personnel
United States Army Corps of Engineers personnel
United States Army officers
Lehigh University alumni
St. John's College (Annapolis/Santa Fe) alumni
Burials at Arlington National Cemetery
Scientists from Maryland
Scientists from Washington, D.C.
20th-century American engineers
20th-century American geologists
Presidents of the International Union of Geodesy and Geophysics